Doro Theou (Greek: Δώρο Θεού; English: God's Gift) is the tenth studio album by Greek artist, Katy Garbi. It was released on 23 June 1999 by Sony Music Greece and certified gold in a month, but after months received platinum certification, selling over 80,000 units*. The album was written by various artists like Giorgos Theofanous who composed six songs, Antonis Vardis, Christos Nikolopoulos, Kiriakos Papadopoulos, Evi Droutsa and Ilias Filippou. It also includes the music video of the title track, due to the video's release prior to the release of the album, and two of the tracks are adapted, "Agkires" from Iste Hendek, Iste Deve and "Zilia" from Kalast Feek Kol Alkalam. "Doro Theou" is often considered a dedication to Garbi's son because it was released during her pregnancy, however the album's insert clarifies that the dedication belongs to her husband, Dionisis, with the lyrics of the title track describing the real-life story of the couple. A translation of the insert reads "Dionisis, this Doro Theou is devoted to you, because you know how to make every day of our common life special".

In 1999, platinum was the album whose sales exceeded 50,000 units.

Track listing

Singles 
The album wasn't widely promoted due to Katy's pregnancy and released only three of fourteen songs becoming singles to radio stations with music videos, directed by Giorgos Gkavalos, and gained massive airplay. The songs "Anisos Agonas", "Pos Fovamai Na Sou Po", "Eisai O Erotas Pou De Pernaei" and "Fleva" were not released as singles, but had good airplay.

"Doro Theou"

"Doro Theou" was the lead single and released on 2 June 1999. Filming took place in advance of the album's release with the album cover art being shot at the same time. Due to her pregnancy, Katy's body is not visible for the duration of the video.

"Agkires"

"Agkires" was the second single and released on 4 August 1999. It was filmed on a Greek island and became one of the summer hits. Similar to the first single, Katy's body was hidden.

"Aponomi Dikaiosinis"

"Aponomi Dikaiosinis" was the third and last single and released released on 29 September 1999. It's the only music video from the album to show Katy's body.

Credits
Credits adapted from liner notes.

Personnel 

 Ilias Achladiotis – programming, keyboards (tracks: 4)
 Charis Andreadis – orchestration (tracks: 4)
 Mohamend Arafa – percussion (tracks: 3, 5, 7, 9, 13)
 Michalis Armagos – guitars (tracks: 1, 6, 10, 11, 12, 14)
 Hakan Bingolou – oud, säz (tracks: 3, 7)
 Giannis Bithikotsis – bouzouki (tracks: 2, 6, 9, 12) / cura (tracks: 1, 2, 6, 10, 12, 14) / baglama (tracks: 1, 2, 6, 9, 12, 14)
 Akis Diximos – second vocal (tracks: 6, 10)
 Rania Dizikiriki – backing vocals (tracks: 3, 5, 7, 9, 13)
 Kostas Doxas – backing vocals (tracks: 1, 11, 14)
 Sarantis Dramalis – trumpet (tracks: 3)
 Vasilis Gkinos – orchestration, programming, keyboards (tracks: 2, 3, 5, 7, 8, 9, 13)
 Kiriakos Gkouventas – violin (tracks: 7, 9) / viola (tracks: 8)
 Dimitris Gkouzgkounis – trumpet (tracks: 3)
 Nikolas Gkouzgkounis – trombone (tracks: 3)
 Stelios Goulielmos – backing vocals (tracks: 3, 5, 7, 9, 13)
 Antonis Gounaris – guitars (tracks: 2, 5, 8, 9, 13)
 Anna Ioannidou – backing vocals (tracks: 3, 5, 7, 9, 13)
 Giannis Kapoulas – oud (tracks: 11, 14) / säz (tracks: 1, 11) / cümbüş (tracks: 10) 
 Katerina Kiriakou – backing vocals (tracks: 1, 11, 14)
 Giorgos Kostoglou – bass (tracks: 2, 5, 7, 8, 9)
 Antonis Koulouris – drums (tracks: 2, 5, 7, 8, 9)
 Manos Koutsaggelidis – kanun (tracks: 5, 13)
 Fedon Lionoudakis – accordion (tracks: 8, 9)
 Stelios Malliaris – second vocal (tracks: 8)
 Christos Nikolopoulos – bouzouki, baglama (tracks: 8)
 Vasilis Nikolopoulos – programming (tracks: 1, 6, 10, 11, 12, 14)
 Alex Panagi – backing vocals (tracks: 1, 11, 14)
 Antonis Remos – second vocal (tracks: 2)
 Giorgos Roilos – percussion (tracks: 1, 11)
 Panagiotis Sachsanidis – trumpet (tracks: 3)
 Paschalis Terzis – second vocal (tracks: 12)
 Giorgos Theofanous – orchestration, keyboards (tracks: 1, 6, 10, 11, 12, 14)
 Anastasis Tsaknakis – trombone (tracks: 3)
 Filippos Tseberoulis – oboe, soprano saxophone (tracks: 4)
 Thanasis Vasilopoulos – clarinet (tracks: 3, 7) / ney (tracks: 2, 3) / fife (tracks: 7)

Production 

 Ioanna Aggelaki – art direction
 Natasa Aggelaki – art direction
 Daniel Anast – photographer
 Takis Argiriou (111 studio) – sound engineer (tracks: 2, 3, 4, 5, 7, 8, 9, 13)
 Thodoris Chrisanthopoulos (Fabelsound) – mastering
 Giannis Chronopoulos (Sierra studio) – vocal engineer (all tracks) / sound engineer (tracks: 2, 3, 4, 5, 7, 8, 9, 13) / mix engineer (tracks: 4)
 Giannis Doulamis – production manager
 Al Giga – styling
 Vasilis Gkinos (Gallery studio) – sound engineer (tracks: 2, 3, 4, 5, 7, 8, 9, 13)
 Giannis Ioannidis (Digital Press Hellas) – mastering
 Giannis Michailidis – hair styling, make up
 Vaggelis Lappas (Sierra studio) – sound engineer (tracks: 2, 3, 4, 5, 7, 8, 9, 13) / mix engineer (tracks: 1, 2, 3, 5, 6, 7, 8, 9, 10, 11, 12, 13, 14)
 Vasilis Nikolopoulos (Power Music studio) – sound engineer (tracks: 1, 6, 10, 11, 12, 14)
 Katerina Sideridou – cover processing

Charts

Accolades 
Doro Theou was gained an award at the Pop Corn Music Awards 1999:

 Best Album Cover

References 

1999 albums
Katy Garbi albums
Greek-language albums
Sony Music Greece albums